Argentina pacifica, sometimes called pacific silverweed, silverweed cinquefoil, or simply silverweed, is a low-growing perennial (6") with pinnately compound green leaves with silvery undersides. It is a member of the species aggregate known as Argentina anserina or Potentilla anserina. The yellow, saucer-shaped flowers appear late spring through summer. Pacific silverweed spreads very quickly in moist areas. Preferring salt marshes, river estuaries and shorelines, they are often seen growing alongside springbank clover. They need sun and regular water.

Pacific silverweed is important in Pacific Northwest coastal indigenous cultures. Indigenous people dig for its edible roots. As an important vegetable, families maintained rights to access patches through potlatch law.  New plants can grow from small root fragments, and with some attention families could guarantee patches persisted for generations "over hundreds, even thousands of years".

Northwest Coast peoples used to dig them in spring with yew-wood shovels before pit-cooking them or boiling them with eulachon grease. Cooked roots have a slightly bitter sweet-potato flavour. Northwest Coast peoples also washed them or mashed them into cakes and dried them for winter.

References

pacifica
Groundcovers
Plants described in 1898